Simon Broad (born February 10, 1963 in Pahiatua) is a New Zealand voice actor living in Hong Kong since July 12, 1981.

Background
Broad started voice-over while working for Godfrey Ho. During the 1980s he was voicing up to 170 films in a year. By 1999 he estimated that he had voiced more than 700 films. They included, to that time, all Chow Yun-fat films and most of Jet Li's. He had also voiced a couple of Jackie Chan films and the rerelease of Bruce Lee's Way of the Dragon. In a South China Morning Post article Broad was described as Hong Kong's viceroy of the voice-over; the doyen of dubbers.

With a fall off in demand for movie-voice over Broad and fellow actor Jack Murphy through their company called Two Guys expanded into voices for animation, particularly Japanese cartoons and the voices for talking toys.

In 2008 he joined Sally Dellow of consultancy Dramatic Difference as a roleplayer and facilitator. Dramatic Difference provide coaching and theatre-led learning and development programmes aimed at the professional business sector.  The relationship between Broad's company Bramp International Ltd and Dramatic Difference is unclear. Bramp are described as global team development trainers for companies such as HSBC. They use video conferencing for training and meetings.

Credits

Broad was also the ADR supervisor on Dragonblade.

References

1963 births
Living people
New Zealand male voice actors